Violeta Tsvetkova (born 29 July 1955) is a retired Bulgarian middle-distance runner who specialized in the 800 metres.

She finished sixth at the 1979 European Indoor Championships, and fifth at the 1980 European Indoor Championships,

Her personal best time was 2:01.07 minutes, achieved in June 1980 in Warsaw.

References

1955 births
Living people
Bulgarian female middle-distance runners
20th-century Bulgarian women
21st-century Bulgarian women